Katha Solla Porom is a 2016 Indian Tamil-language comedy film directed by Kalyaan in his directorial debut. The film stars child actors Shibana, Raveena Daha, Aravind Raghunath and Arjun in the lead roles with Aadukalam Naren and Vijayalakshmi in pivotal roles.

Cast 
Shibana as Priya 
Raveena Daha as Anitha
Aravind Raghunath as Arun 
Arjun as Arjun
Aadukalam Naren and Vijayalakshmi as a couple who lost their kid
Kaali Venkat
Rajendran
Supergood Subramani as Police Officer

Production 
Kalyaan, who participated on the Naalaya Iyakunar TV show, makes his directorial debut with this film.

Soundtrack 
"Hey Gundaa" - Chorus
"Mummy Daddy" - Chorus
"Aararo" - Chinnaponnu, Chorus

Release 
The New Indian Express wrote that "Kadha Solla Porom has a feel-good flavour and positivity. And capsuled within just an hour and forty minutes, it makes for an ideal summer vacation experience, not just for kids but for adults too". On the contrary, The Times of India gave the film a rating of two out of five stars and stated that "If only had the director displayed the kind of focus that these scenes have, this could have become an emotionally moving film like Azhagu Kutti Chellam".

References

External links 

2016 films
2010s Tamil-language films
2010s children's drama films
Indian children's drama films